Sergio Stefanini (18 February 1922 – 7 August 2009) was an Italian basketball player. He competed in the men's tournament at the 1948 Summer Olympics and the 1952 Summer Olympics.

References

External links
 

1922 births
2009 deaths
Italian men's basketball players
Olympic basketball players of Italy
Basketball players at the 1948 Summer Olympics
Basketball players at the 1952 Summer Olympics
People from Marostica
Sportspeople from the Province of Vicenza